The Mohawk Trail began as a Native American trade route which connected Atlantic tribes with tribes in Upstate New York and beyond.  It followed the Millers River, Deerfield River and crossed the Hoosac Range, in the area that is now northwestern Massachusetts.

Today the Mohawk Trail is a part of Routes 2 and 2A. The Berkshire mountains are clearly visible from several points.
The modern day Mohawk Trail is considered one of the most beautiful drives in Massachusetts.  There are numerous points of interest along the way, including many scenic viewpoints, roadside attractions and gift shops.  Of particular note is Hail to the Sunrise at Mohawk Park, a statue made in tribute to Native American heritage.  A portion of the trail parallels the Deerfield River for several miles, and passes through the village of Shelburne Falls, and the Bridge of Flowers.  The route crosses the Connecticut River via the historic French King Bridge at a height of 140 feet.  The road reaches a high elevation of 2272 feet at Whitcomb Summit.  On the western side of the summit there is the popular hairpin turn and lookout, overlooking the city of North Adams and the Taconic Mountains. On the eastern side, the highway descends steeply eastward from Whitcomb Summit down the slope of the Hoosac Range following the Cold River to the Deerfield River. Notable features include the infamous Dead Man's Curve.

A six-mile section of the Mohawk Trail was severely damaged by Hurricane Irene in August 2011. A considerable portion of the road is surrounded by the Mohawk Trail State Forest, a  forest, known for its camping, and occasional encounters with bobcats and black bears. Within this area there is substantial acreage of old growth forest containing many of the tallest trees in Massachusetts as verified by the Eastern Native Tree Society.
The route passes close to Vermont's southern border, and alternate routes travel north into Vermont to Harriman Reservoir and Ball Mountain State Park.  The western terminus in Williamstown provides access to Mount Greylock, U.S. Route 7, and New York State Route 2.

A portion of the historic footpath route, running through Florida, Savoy, and Charlemont, from the confluence of the Cold and Deerfield Rivers up the Cold River valley to Wheeler Brook, was added to the National Register of Historic Places on April 3, 1973.  This route, where the footpath itself is no longer extant in original form, is located on the north bank of the Cold River, with the modern roadway running along the south bank included in the listed area as an intrusion on the setting.

See also
National Register of Historic Places listings in Berkshire County, Massachusetts

References

External links

 Mohawk Trail Region | The Mohawk Trail Association
 
 

Historic sites in Massachusetts
Historic trails and roads in Massachusetts
History of Berkshire County, Massachusetts
Native American trails in the United States

National Register of Historic Places in Franklin County, Massachusetts
National Register of Historic Places in Berkshire County, Massachusetts
Native American history of Massachusetts